Dietmar Demuth (born 14 January 1955) is a German former footballer. Since 2016, he has been the manager of BSG Chemie Leipzig.

References

External links

1955 births
Living people
People from Querfurt
People from Bezirk Halle
German footballers
Footballers from Saxony-Anhalt
FC St. Pauli players
Bayer 04 Leverkusen players
Kickers Offenbach players
Bundesliga players
2. Bundesliga players
German football managers
2. Bundesliga managers
FC St. Pauli managers
Chemnitzer FC managers
Eintracht Braunschweig managers
Eintracht Braunschweig non-playing staff
3. Liga managers
SV Babelsberg 03 managers
Association football defenders